Night Life is the second album by British R&B and soul music singer Maxine Nightingale. She is best known for her hits in the 1970s, with the million-seller "Right Back Where We Started From" (1975, U.K. & 1976, U.S.), "Love Hit Me" (Track 3 of this album), and "Lead Me On" (1979).

Track listing

Side One
"Will You Be My Lover" (Steve Fields) - 3:00
"You Are Everything" (Thom Bell, Linda Creed) - 2:47
"Love Hit Me"† (J. Vincent Edwards) - 2:46
"You" (Christopher Bond) - 3:50
"Get It Up for Love" (Ned Doheny) - 4:07

Side Two
"Didn't I (Blow Your Mind This Time)" (William Hart, Thom Bell) - 3:22
"Love or Let Me Be Lonely"‡ (Anita Poree, Jerry Peters, Skip Scarborough) - 3:34
"I Wonder Who's Waiting Up for You Tonight" (Ed Welch, Graham Dee) - 3:18
"How Much Love" (Barry Mann, Leo Sayer) - 3:19
"Right Now"¶ (Dennis Belfield) - 4:33

†Arranged by Jimmie Haskell and Michel Colombier
¶Arranged by Larry Carlton - strings arranged by Michel Colombier
‡Produced by Pierre Tubbs and Del Newman

Charts

Musicians
Larry Carlton - guitar
Lee Ritenour - guitar
Ed Greene - drums
Ron Tutt - drums
Jim Gordon - drums
Tom Scott - saxophone
Larry Muhoberac - keyboards
Wilton Felder - saxophone
Anthony Jackson - bass
Gayle Levant - harp
Michel Colombier - keyboards
Jay Graydon - guitar
Milt Holland - drums
L. Scretching - various instruments
Denny Diante - percussion
The Sid Sharp Strings (James Gadson, Scott Edwards, Marlo Henderson and John Rowan).
Background vocals - Sigidi, Harold Clayton and David Oliver.

Production
Remix by Denny Diante and Ron Malo
Album art direction - Ria Lewerke
Album design - Bill Burks
Album photography - Derek Richards
Recorded at Silvery Moon Studios/Devonshire Sound Studios, North Hollywood, California/Marquee Studio, London.
Engineers - Ron Malo, James Armstrong and Jerry Hudgins

References

1977 albums
Maxine Nightingale albums
Albums arranged by Jimmie Haskell
Albums produced by Del Newman
United Artists Records albums